Jan-Werner Müller is a German political philosopher and historian of political ideas working at Princeton University.

Biography 
Born in Bad Honnef in North Rhine-Westphalia, Germany in 1970, Jan-Werner Müller studied at Free University of Berlin, University College London, the University of Oxford's St Antony’s College and Princeton University. He was Fellow of All Souls College in Oxford from 1996 to 2003 and a Fellow of St Antony’s College's European Studies Centre from 2003 to 2005. He has taught political theory and the history of political ideas at Princeton since 2005.

He has also been invited professor at the École des Hautes Études en Sciences Sociales, the Institut d’Études Politiques in Paris and at the Ludwig Maximilian University of Munich.

He is a co-founder of the European College of Liberal Arts in Berlin.

He regularly writes opinion pieces for mainstream publications, such as The Guardian, Neue Zürcher Zeitung, The New York Times, Süddeutsche Zeitung, Le Monde, Project Syndicate, The New York Review of Books, The London Review of Books, and more specialised publications such as Foreign Affairs, Social Europe and Verfassungsblog.

Works 

 Another Country. German Intellectuals, Unification and National Identity. Yale University Press, New Haven, Connecticut, 2000, .
 A Dangerous Mind. Carl Schmitt in Post War European Thought. Yale University Press, New Haven, Connecticut, 2003, .
 As editor: Memory and Power in Post War Europe. Studies in the Presence of the Past. Cambridge University Press, Cambridge, 2002, .
 As editor: German Ideologies since 1945. Studies in the Political Thought and Culture of the Bonn Republic. Palgrave Macmillan, New York City, New York, 2003, .
 Constitutional Patriotism. Princeton University Press, Princeton, New Jersey, 2007, 
 Contesting Democracy. Political Ideas in Twentieth Century Europe. Yale University Press, New Haven, Connecticut, 2011, 
 Wo Europa endet. Ungarn, Brüssel und das Schicksal der liberalen Demokratie. Suhrkamp, Berlin, 2013, 
 What is populism ? University of Pennsylvania Press, Philadelphia, Pennsylvania, 2016, 
 (as summary) : The rise and rise of populism ?, chapter in The Age of Perplexity, Penguin Random House Grupo Editorial, 
Democracy Rules. Farrar, Straus and Giroux, New York City, New York, 2021, ISBN 9780374136475

References

External links 

 Personal webpage

German political philosophers
German philosophers
21st-century German historians
German political scientists
Historians of political thought
Populism scholars
Princeton University faculty
Fellows of All Souls College, Oxford
Academic staff of the School for Advanced Studies in the Social Sciences
Academic staff of Sciences Po
Free University of Berlin alumni
Alumni of University College London
Alumni of St Antony's College, Oxford
Princeton University alumni
Living people
1970 births
Carl Schmitt scholars